The 2016–17 All-Ireland Junior Club Football Championship was the 16th staging of the All-Ireland Junior Club Football Championship since its establishment by the Gaelic Athletic Association.

The All-Ireland final was played on 19 February 2017 at Croke Park in Dublin, between Glenbeigh-Glencar and Rock St Patrick's. Glenbeigh-Glencar won the match by 1-14 to 1-11 to claim their first ever championship title.

All-Ireland Junior Club Football Championship

All-Ireland final

References

2016 in Irish sport
2017 in Irish sport
All-Ireland Junior Club Football Championship
All-Ireland Junior Club Football Championship